Atlixco FC is a Mexican football club that plays in the Tercera División de México. The club is based in Atlixco, Puebla and was founded in 1954.

History

Atlixco FC was founded in 1954 when a group of local youths came together and decided to form Atlixco Futbol Club led by Padre de San Agustín Carlos Martínez. that represented the City of Atlixco.This came to be in La Cancha La Concha were they would play their home games against rival futbol club such as Club San Salvador who was founded in 1958 .
  

First Team
Leopoldo Baleón             
Rafael Paramo                
Ignacio Novoa                
Alfonso Espinoza*             
Martín Ramírez               
José Alvarado

Damaso Alvarado
Adolfo García
Luis Valencia Flores
Armando Rosas
 Honorio Pintle

Jaguares
In 1995 The club in collaboration join forces and represented the Universidad Cuauhtémoc first in the third division and then in the 2nd division . The club played in the city of Atlixco during its first games then played in the Estadio Olímpico Ignacio Zaragoza  just a few miles north to Atlixco in Puebla City. In the 1996–97 season the club managed to make the playoffs but was eliminated in the round of 16.

Recent Years
It was announced in October 2021 that Atlixco FC would be one of the Mexican clubs joining the United Premier Soccer League .

kit
 
Atlixco FC started off using a green shirt with white shorts and green socks in the 1950s due to Padre de San Agustín Carlos Martínez in honor of Club Leon who was his home town club from Guanajuato. In the 1960s, the club would adopt red and white  vertical stripes for their home kit and a white Jersey with black shorts with white socks for their away jersey . In 1967 the club would use green once more in their home jersey using a similar kit to Sporting CP being that Artur Da Silva Pedro who has just migrated to Mexico from Portugal had sponsored the teams uniform that year, also playing for the squad that year .In 1979 the club would use a Navy Blue Jersey and White shorts do to the city of Atlixco celebrating its 400-year anniversary .

Past Jerseys

First kit evolution Home

Jaguares
Jaguares

Honours
Liga Regional   1983–84, 1984–85

Campeon De Campeones  1984-85

See also
Football in Mexico
Atlixco
Tercera División de México

External links
Tercera Divicion

References 

Football clubs in Puebla
Association football clubs established in 2009
2009 establishments in Mexico